William Kellogg may refer to:

 William Kellogg (Illinois politician), U.S. Representative from Illinois
 William Pitt Kellogg 19th century Governor of Louisiana
 William Welch Kellogg, climatologist

See also
 Will Keith Kellogg, founder of the Kellogg Company